Malin Svahnström (born 10 June 1980) is a Swedish Olympic swimmer currently representing Väsby SS. Svahnström participated in the 2000 Summer Olympics and the 2004 Summer Olympics, both times as a part of a relay team. In the 2000 event she swum the prelims in the 4×100 m freestyle relay, that later won a bronze medal. In Athens 2004 she was a part of the 4×200 m freestyle team  along with Josefin Lillhage, Ida Mattsson and Lotta Wänberg that finished eighth in the finals.

Clubs
Väsby SS

References

 

1980 births
Living people
People from Upplands Väsby Municipality
Swedish female medley swimmers
Olympic swimmers of Sweden
Swimmers at the 2000 Summer Olympics
Swimmers at the 2004 Summer Olympics
Olympic bronze medalists in swimming
Swedish female freestyle swimmers
Medalists at the FINA World Swimming Championships (25 m)
European Aquatics Championships medalists in swimming
Väsby SS swimmers
Medalists at the 2000 Summer Olympics
Olympic bronze medalists for Sweden
Sportspeople from Stockholm County
21st-century Swedish women